The 1996 Giro del Trentino was the 20th edition of the Tour of the Alps cycle race and was held on 8 May to 12 May 1996. The race started in Arco di Trentino and finished in Trento. The race was won by Wladimir Belli.

General classification

References

1996
1996 in road cycling
1996 in Italian sport